The 2018 Hall of Fame Tennis Championships (also known as the Dell Technologies Hall of Fame Open for sponsorship reasons) was a men's tennis tournament played on outdoor grass courts. It was the 43rd edition of the Hall of Fame Tennis Championships, and part of the ATP World Tour 250 series of the 2017 ATP World Tour. It took place at the International Tennis Hall of Fame in Newport, Rhode Island, United States, from July 16 through July 22, 2018.

Singles main draw entrants

Seeds 

 1 Rankings are as of July 2, 2018

Other entrants 
The following players received wildcards into the singles main draw:
  Christian Harrison
  Jason Jung 
  Donald Young

The following player received entry using a protected ranking:
  James Duckworth

The following players received entry from the qualifying draw:
  JC Aragone
  Alex Bolt
  Víctor Estrella Burgos
  Bernard Tomic

Withdrawals 
Before the tournament
  Pierre-Hugues Herbert → replaced by  Nicolas Mahut
  John Isner → replaced by  Marcel Granollers
  Mikhail Kukushkin → replaced by  Ramkumar Ramanathan
  Lukáš Lacko → replaced by  Sergiy Stakhovsky
  Mackenzie McDonald → replaced by  Tim Smyczek

ATP doubles main draw entrants

Seeds 

 Rankings are as of July 2, 2018

Other entrants 
The following pairs received wildcards into the doubles main draw:
  Lleyton Hewitt /  Jordan Thompson
  Martin Redlicki /  Evan Zhu

Withdrawals 
During the tournament
  Nicolas Mahut

Champions

Singles 

  Steve Johnson def.  Ramkumar Ramanathan, 7–5, 3–6, 6–2

Doubles 

 Jonathan Erlich /  Artem Sitak def.  Marcelo Arévalo /  Miguel Ángel Reyes-Varela, 6–1, 6–2

References

External links